Henry Drummond may refer to:

Henry Drummond (1730–1795), British Member of Parliament for Midhurst
Henry Drummond (1762–1794), British Member of Parliament for Castle Rising
Henry Drummond (1786–1860), English banker, Member of Parliament for West Surrey, writer and Irvingite
Henry Drummond (evangelist) (1851–1897), Scottish evangelist, writer and lecturer
Henry Drummond (fictional character), a character from Inherit the Wind

See also